The News (formerly The Evening News) is a weekly newspaper, published Thursdays, serving New Glasgow and Pictou County, Nova Scotia.

See also
List of newspapers in Canada

References

New Glasgow, Nova Scotia
Newspapers established in 1911
SaltWire Network publications
Daily newspapers published in Nova Scotia
1911 establishments in Nova Scotia